The 14th Central Committee of the Chinese Communist Party was in session from 1992 to 1997. It held seven plenary sessions.  It was preceded by the 13th Central Committee. It was elected by the 14th National Congress of the Chinese Communist Party and in turn elected the 14th Politburo of the Chinese Communist Party.

Members
In stroke order of surnames:

Brief chronology
1st Plenary Session
Date: October 19, 1992
Location: Beijing
Significance: Jiang Zemin was elected General Secretary and Chairman of the Central Military Commission. A 22-members Politburo, a 7-members Politburo Standing Committee and a 5-members Secretariat were elected. Hu Jintao entered the Politburo Standing Committee for the first time as its youngest member.
2nd Plenary Session
Date: March 5–7, 1993
Location: Beijing
Significance: The meeting approved some economic measures, a program for institutional reform, and lists of nominees for top posts of the 8th National People's Congress and the 8th National Committee of the Chinese People's Political Consultative Conference.
3rd Plenary Session
Date: November 11–14, 1993
Location: Beijing
Significance: A Decision of the CCP Central Committee on Certain Issues in Establishing a Socialist Market Economy System was adopted, fostering the establishment of private enterprises. This clearly echoed Deng Xiaoping's "Southern Trip" in 1992, when the still-powerful paramount leader had criticized the slowness of economic reform after the 1989 Tian'anmen Square protests.
4th Plenary Session
Date: September 25–28, 1994
Location: Beijing
Significance: The meeting was focused on improving Party leadership in the period of socialism with Chinese characteristics. It was first asserted that collective leadership based on generational succession was to be enhanced: Deng Xiaoping was proclaimed as the leader of the "second generation", and Jiang Zemin as the leader of the "third generation". This principle was later laid down in the Party Constitution.
5th Plenary Session
Date: September 25–28, 1995
Location: Beijing
Significance: Guidelines for the 9th Five-Year Plan and other socio-economic programs were adopted. Chen Xitong, rival to Jiang Zemin as leader of the dubbed "Beijing clique", was accused of corruption, removed from his posts of Politburo member, Central Committee member, National People's Congress delegate and party secretary of Beijing, and arrested. Defense Minister Chi Haotian was appointed CMC vice-chairman. Deng Xiaoping Theory was first mentioned in the official communique.
6th Plenary Session
Date: October 7–10, 1996
Location: Beijing
Significance: Meeting focused on "building socialist spiritual civilization". The concept of Deng Xiaoping Theory was further elaborated as the Party's basic guideline for the "primary stage of socialism", i.e. socialism with Chinese characteristics, and was raised to the same level as Marxism-Leninism and Mao Zedong Thought.
7th Plenary Session
Date: September 6–9, 1997
Location: Beijing
Significance: Preparations for the Party's 15th National Congress were made. This was also the first meeting held after Deng Xiaoping's death.

External links
 14th Central Committee of the CCP, People's Daily Online.

Central Committee of the Chinese Communist Party
1992 establishments in China
1997 disestablishments in China